The Zulu Wikipedia is the Zulu-language edition of Wikipedia, a free, open-content encyclopedia. Started in November 2003, it rose to 186 articles as of May 13, 2009, and to 766 on April 25, 2016, making it the 247th largest Wikipedia language edition (down from 221st in the previous date).

History
Although it was the third African-language Wikipedia to reach 100 articles, progress has been slow, and it has been surpassed by numerous other African languages.

As Zulu is mostly mutually intelligible with Xhosa, both of which are Nguni languages, it is possible for articles in the Zulu edition to be easily translated into Xhosa for the Xhosa Wikipedia. Similar trans-wiki efforts have been made for Scandinavian-language editions, such as the Swedish, Norwegian, and Danish through Wikimedia's Skanwiki collaboration tool.

In January 2012, the Zulu Wikipedia was proposed for closing. The proposal was rejected in March 2012.

See also
 Afrikaans Wikipedia
 Lingala Wikipedia
 Somali Wikipedia
 Swahili Wikipedia
 Tsonga Wikipedia
 Yoruba Wikipedia

References

External links
  Zulu Wikipedia
  Zulu Wikipedia mobile version (not fully supported)
 Statistics for Zulu Wikipedia by Erik Zachte

Wikipedias by language
Internet properties established in 2003
Zulu-language mass media
African encyclopedias